Erik Thomas Shoji (born August 24, 1989) is an American professional volleyball player. He is a member of the US national team, a bronze medalist at the Olympic Games Rio 2016 and the 2018 World Championship, 2014 World League and 2015 World Cup winner, and the 2022 Champions League winner. At the professional club level, he plays for ZAKSA Kędzierzyn-Koźle.

Personal life
Shoji's parents are Dave and Mary Shoji. His older brother Kawika Shoji is also a player (setter), the former member of the US national team.

Career
Shoji was a member of the Men’s Junior National Team in 2008 and 2009. He joined the senior national team in 2013 and helped the team win the gold medal at the NORCECA Championship.

Honours

Clubs
 CEV Champions League
  2021/2022 – with ZAKSA Kędzierzyn-Koźle

 CEV Cup
  2015/2016 – with Berlin Recycling Volleys

 National championships
 2013/2014  Austrian Cup, with Hypo Tirol Innsbruck
 2013/2014  Austrian Championship, with Hypo Tirol Innsbruck
 2015/2016  German Cup, with Berlin Recycling Volleys
 2015/2016  German Championship, with Berlin Recycling Volleys
 2021/2022  Polish Cup, with ZAKSA Kędzierzyn-Koźle
 2021/2022  Polish Championship, with ZAKSA Kędzierzyn-Koźle
 2022/2023  Polish Cup, with ZAKSA Kędzierzyn-Koźle

Youth national team
 2006  NORCECA U19 Championship

Individual awards
 2007: FIVB U19 World Championship – Best Digger
 2008: NORCECA U21 Championship – Best Receiver 
 2008: NORCECA U21 Championship – Best Defender
 2008: NORCECA U21 Championship – Best Libero
 2015: FIVB World Cup – Best Libero
 2019: FIVB Nations League – Best Libero

References

External links

 Player profile at TeamUSA.org
 
 
 
 Player profile at LegaVolley.it 
 Player profile at PlusLiga.pl 
 Player profile at Volleybox.net

1989 births
Living people
American sportspeople of Japanese descent
Volleyball players from Honolulu
American men's volleyball players
Olympic volleyball players of the United States
Volleyball players at the 2016 Summer Olympics
Volleyball players at the 2020 Summer Olympics
Olympic bronze medalists for the United States in volleyball
Medalists at the 2016 Summer Olympics
American expatriate sportspeople in Germany
Expatriate volleyball players in Germany
American expatriate sportspeople in Austria
Expatriate volleyball players in Austria
American expatriate sportspeople in Russia
Expatriate volleyball players in Russia
American expatriate sportspeople in Italy
Expatriate volleyball players in Italy
American expatriate sportspeople in Poland
Expatriate volleyball players in Poland
Stanford Cardinal men's volleyball players
ZAKSA Kędzierzyn-Koźle players
Liberos